Sepia mestus, also known as the reaper cuttlefish or red cuttlefish, is a species of cuttlefish native to the southwestern Pacific Ocean, specifically Escape Reef off Queensland to Murrays Beach off Jervis Bay. Reports of this species from China and Vietnam are now known to be misidentifications. S. mestus lives at a depth of between 0 and 22 m.

Sepia mestus exhibits sexual dimorphism. Females grow to a mantle length (ML) of 124 mm, while males do not exceed 77 mm ML.

The type specimen was collected off the Australian coast and is deposited at The Natural History Museum in London.

Anatomy 
Cephalopods share many similar anatomical structures and it can be hard to distinguish between different species in certain situations. All cephalopods have a similar basic anatomical plan. Structures include a set of limbs that diverge from the head in a ring around the mouth. Major body parts such as reproductive systems, digestive organs and the gills are contained in the mantle (a muscular bag) at the posterior portion of the animal.

Cuttlefish including S. mestus differ from octopuses as they have an additional pair of limbs that octopuses lack. These limbs are known as feeding tentacles. These tentacles are found between arms three and four. The feeding tentacles are typically used for extended quickly to capture prey.

Sepia mestus is commonly referred to as the red cuttlefish. When undisturbed it is typically recognized by its red colouration and two dark spots on the posterior of the animal.

Sepia mestus can see contrast between stripes in the what is called the polarizing drum.

Mobility 
Sepia mestus propels itself through the water using a technique that is seen in many Cephalopods. Water is pushed through a cavity that is formed by the mantle. The animal ejects water from the mantle via a tubular funnel. This technique allows the animal to move through the environment using jet propulsion. A relaxed mantle allows for water to fill the mantle cavity. A contracted mantle forces water out through the tubular funnel. The funnel can be pointed in different directions allowing for movement forward and backward away from predators or towards prey.

Common predators and prey 
Some common predators of S. mestus include bluefish (Pomatomus saltatrix), summer flounder (Paralichthys dentatus), and black seabass (Centropristis striata).

Common prey of S. mestus and other cuttlefish include different species of shrimp, crab, and young fish.

Anti-predator behaviour 
Camouflage is a distinctive feature of Cephalopods including S. mestus. Camouflage is achieved through changing of the animals colour and texture. Small organs in the skin allow called chromatophores allow for colour change. These chromatophores can be described as very small bags of dense pigment that can be expanded or contracted in which a spot of particular colour can be displayed.

Sepia mestus and most other species of cuttlefish can alter skin texture to blend in with their environment. This is achieved by pushing up flaps of skin to match shapes of rock, coral, and seaweed. These flaps are known as papillae. Contracting rings of muscle around the base of these papillae allows for the flaps to rise, changing the appearance of the animal.

Sepia mestus can also bury itself under the sand to avoid predators.

Life cycle and mating behaviour 
To attract a potential mate, a male will perform various displays to catch the attention of a female. Once a male is successful in attracting a mate, the male will insert the hectocotylus into the female’s mantle cavity to fertilize the female. The female will then lay her eggs nearby.

After spawning and brooding, male and female adults usually die shortly after. Like most members of the class Cephalopoda, S. mestus are gonochoric. After the embryos develop for about two months, they will hatch and remain in a planktonic stage briefly before developing into adults.

Dispersal of eggs 
All cuttlefish including S. mestus disperse their eggs by attachment to the sea floor, usually on or under hard surfaces such as rock and coral.

Distribution 
Sepia mestus is endemic to Australia (Reid et al. 2005), ranging along the east coast from northern Queensland to Jervis Bay in New South Wales (Reid et al.2005).

Habitat 
Sepia mestus lives in depths up to 22 m. inhabiting a tropical climate

Sepia mestus typically lives on rocky reefs and is typically seen under ledges (Norman 2003).

Many of the world's cuttlefish species are found in Australian waters, including S. mestus.

Conservation status 
It is considered of least concern.

Threats 
Increasing levels of carbon dioxide in the atmosphere causes ocean acidification and is potentially a threat to all cuttlefish. According to studies, high CO2 concentrations, cuttlefishes tend to lay down a denser cuttlebone. This could negatively affect cuttlefish buoyancy regulation (Gutowska et al. 2010).

References

External links

Cuttlefish
Cephalopods described in 1849
Taxa named by John Edward Gray